Macraucheniidae is a family in the extinct South American ungulate order Litopterna, that resembled various camelids. The reduced nasal bones of their skulls was originally suggested to have housed a small proboscis, similar to that of the saiga antelope. However, one study suggested that they were openings for large moose-like nostrils. Conversely, prehistoric pictographs by indigenous people seems to depict animals interpreted as macraucheniids with trunks. Their hooves were similar to those of rhinoceroses today, with a simple ankle joint and three digits on each foot. Thus, they may have been capable of rapid directional change when running away from predators, such as large phorusrhacid terror birds, sparassodont metatherians, giant short-faced bears (Arctotherium) and saber-toothed cats (Smilodon). Macraucheniids probably lived in large herds to gain protection against these predators, as well as to facilitate finding mates for reproduction.

The family Macraucheniidae includes genera such as Theosodon, Xenorhinotherium, and Macrauchenia. Macrauchenia is the best-known and most recent macraucheniid. It became extinct during the Pleistocene Epoch. It was one of the few  litopterns to survive the ecological pressures of the Great American Interchange between North and South America, which took place after the Isthmus of Panama rose above sea level some 3 million years ago. It may instead have died out in the aftermath of the invasion of the Americas by human hunters. When Macrauchenia died out, so too did the Macraucheniidae and the entire litoptern order.

Sequencing of mitochondrial DNA extracted from a Macrauchenia patachonica fossil from a cave in southern Chile indicates that Macrauchenia (and by inference, Litopterna) is the sister group to Perissodactyla, with an estimated divergence date of 66 million years ago. Analysis of collagen sequences obtained from Macrauchenia and Toxodon gave the same conclusion, adding notoungulates to the sister group clade.

References

Bibliography

External links 
 Phylogeny of Macraucheniidae

 
Litopterns
Prehistoric mammal families
Quaternary mammals of South America
Neogene mammals of South America
Paleogene mammals of South America
Ypresian first appearances
Holocene extinctions